The Stena Estrid is a passenger and vehicle 'Ro-Pax' ferry which sails for Stena Line on its Holyhead - Dublin route. She is the first ferry in the E-Flexer class, and was delivered to the company on 15 November 2019.

She made her maiden commercial crossing between Holyhead and Dublin on 13 January 2020.  This maiden voyage was delayed by approximately two hours due to adverse weather conditions with the new vessel sailing through Storm Brendan to arrive at Dublin later than scheduled.  Stena Estrid has capacity for 1,000 passengers (and crew) and up to 3,100 lane metres of freight and 120 passenger cars.

Stena Estrid was featured in an episode of BBC’s Dom Digs In presented by Dominic Littlewood

References

External links

Estrid
2019 ships